The 2018  ASEAN Basketball League (ABL) Finals was the best-of-5 championship series of the 2017–18 ABL season and the conclusion of the season's playoffs. Mono Vampire and San Miguel Alab Pilipinas competed for the 8th championship contested by the league.

After a decider Game 5, San Miguel Alab Pilipinas eventually clinched the club's first franchise championship in its history, and the third ABL Championship that came from the Philippines. Bobby Ray Parks Jr. was named as the Finals MVP after averaging 23 points per game in the finals series.

Background

Head-to-head matchups 

This is the first playoff and finals meeting between Alab Pilipinas and Mono Vampire.

Series summary

Game summaries 
All times local; UTC+8 for the Philippines, and UTC+7 for Thailand

Game 1

Game 2

Game 3

Game 4

Game 5

References

External links 

2017–18 in Philippine basketball leagues
2017–18 ABL season
2017–18 in Thai basketball
April 2018 sports events in the Philippines
May 2018 sports events in the Philippines